Casey Anne Burgess (born 19 December 1988) is an Australian actress, television personality and singer. Burgess is a former member of the Australian children's musical group Hi-5. She was born in Sydney, the daughter of Ray Burgess, who also pursued a musical career and was a presenter on Countdown.

Career
Burgess's first television appearances included the TV show Home and Away and the TV movie Scorched. At the age of fifteen, she was also a presenter for Girl TV.

Burgess joined the Australian children's musical group Hi-5 in April 2008. As part of the group, she toured and filmed the television series of the same name. She departed the group in January 2013 after five years, to pursue a solo music career.

After leaving Hi-5, she began work on her debut album with Fox Studio. In 2013, Burgess was also a guest singer on the anti-fracking single "No Fracking Way" by Leo Sayer to help raise funds for anti-fracking group Lock the Gate.

In 2020, Burgess released her first solo album entitled Space to Breathe.

Discography

Albums

Filmography

References

1988 births
Living people
Australian women singer-songwriters
Australian television actresses
Singers from Sydney
Australian female dancers
Australian children's musicians
21st-century Australian singers
Australian women pop singers
21st-century Australian women singers